Acanthophila vixidistinctella is a moth in the family Gelechiidae. It is found in Russia, where it is known only from the southern part of Primorsky Krai.

The wingspan is 8–10.5 mm. The forewings are dark grey with indistinct darker spots at the middle and end of the cell. The hindwings are dark grey.

References

vixidistinctella
Moths described in 2003
Moths of Asia